Maritime is the southernmost of Togo's five regions, with the country's only shoreline on the Bight of Benin. Tsévié serves as the regional capital. It is the smallest region in terms of area, but it has the largest population.

Other major cities in the Maritime region include Lomé, the Capital of Togo, and Aného.

Maritime is located south of Plateaux Region. In the west, it borders the Volta Region of Ghana, and in the east it borders two departments of Benin: Kouffo farther north, and Mono farther south.

Prefectures

Maritime is divided into the prefectures of Avé, Bas-Mono, Golfe, Lacs, Vo, Yoto, and Zio.

References

Maritime Region